Odd Fossengen (27 February 1945 – 29 December 2017) was a Norwegian international motorcycle speedway rider.

Career Summary 
Fossengen signed for the Poole Pirates in 1968 following a successful trial with the club and he proved to be a popular signing with the Poole supporters. In 1968 he finished 3rd in the World Pairs Final with Øyvind S. Berg. His only major honour came in 1969, with Poole winning the British League Championship. In May 1974, Fossengen's speedway career ended after he suffered a badly broken thigh.  He was hit by his compatriot Ulf Lovaas' bike while riding for Poole against Oxford.

He moved back to Oslo in 1974 and worked for a firm selling and repairing hydraulic machinery for 7 years. He then set up his own firm selling and repairing compressed air machinery.

Fossengen suffered a massive heart attack on 27 December 2017 and died on 29 December 2017. He is survived by his wife, Susan, and their three daughters, Kirsty, Katrina and Annika.

World Final appearances

World Pairs Championship
 1968* -  Kempten (with Øyvind S. Berg) - 3rd - 16pts (11)
* Unofficial World Championships.

References 

1945 births
2017 deaths
Norwegian speedway riders
Poole Pirates riders
People from Nes, Akershus
Sportspeople from Viken (county)